Sarrià de Ter is a village in the province of Girona and autonomous community of Catalonia, Spain. It is part of the metropolitan area of the city of Girona.

Sarrià borders Sant Julià de Ramis to the north, Girona to the south and east, and Sant Gregori to the west. Its territory occupies slightly more than four square kilometers. As of 2015, Sarrià de Ter had a population of 4,973.

In 1976, Sarrià was formally annexed to the neighboring city of Girona. In 1979, with the return to democratic municipal government across Spain after the end of the Francoist State, Sarrià de Ter regained its status as an independent municipality.

References

External links
 Government data pages 

Municipalities in Gironès